Propanethiol is an organic compound with the molecular formula C3H8S. It belongs to the group of thiols. It is a colorless liquid with a strong, offensive odor. It is moderately toxic and is less dense than water and slightly soluble in water. It is used as a feedstock for insecticides. It is  highly flammable and it gives off irritating or toxic fumes (or gases) in a fire. Heating it will cause rise in pressure with risk of bursting.

Chemistry
Propanethiol is chemically classified among the thiols, which are organic compounds with molecular formulas and structural formulas similar to alcohols, except that sulfur-containing sulfhydryl group (-SH) replaces the oxygen-containing hydroxyl group in the molecule. Propanethiol's basic molecular formula is C3H7SH, and its structural formula is similar to that of the alcohol n-propanol.

Propanethiol is manufactured commercially by the reaction of propene with hydrogen sulfide with ultraviolet light initiation in an anti-Markovnikov addition.  It can also be prepared by the reaction of sodium hydrosulfide with 1-chloropropane.

References 

Alkanethiols
Foul-smelling chemicals
Propyl compounds